The Rest Is Silence may refer to:
 "The rest is silence", the last words of Prince Hamlet in Shakespeare's play Hamlet
 The Rest Is Silence (1959 film) (German: Der Rest ist Schweigen), a 1959 German film
 A lyric in the song "Flesh Failures/Let the Sun Shine" from the 1967 musical Hair
 The Rest Is Silence (Randy album), a 1996 album by the Swedish band Randy
 Ostalo je ćutanje (English: The Rest Is Silence), a 1996 album by the Serbian band Riblja Čorba
 The Rest Is Silence (2007 film), a 2007 Romanian film

See also
 The Rest Is Noise, a 2007 nonfiction book by Alex Ross